Arctognathus is an extinct genus of gorgonopsids that throve during the Late Permian in the Karoo basin of what is now South Africa.

Discovery
 
A carnivore, like all gorgonopsid, Arctognathus  was given its name ("Bear jaw") in reference to its short and rounded snout. There is only one recognized species, A. curvimola.

Description
It was a small gorgonopsid with a total length estimated at 1.1 m and an 18 cm skull.

Classification
 
 
Below is a cladogram from the phylogenetic analysis of Gebauer (2007):

See also
 List of therapsids

References

Bibliography
 
 

Gorgonopsia
Prehistoric therapsid genera
Lopingian synapsids of Africa
Fossil taxa described in 1911
Taxa named by Robert Broom
Lopingian genus first appearances
Lopingian genus extinctions